Robin Hooper (born 14 June 1934) is a British alpine skier. He competed in the men's giant slalom at the 1956 Winter Olympics.

References

1934 births
Living people
British male alpine skiers
Olympic alpine skiers of Great Britain
Alpine skiers at the 1956 Winter Olympics
Place of birth missing (living people)